Antoine Marini was a 15th-century theologian and political thinker who, among other things, contemplated the establishing of a European Court of Justice and a pan-European parliament. He was born in Grenoble, France.

He was in favor of curtailing the power of the Papacy on political matters, and in this capacity served as adviser to King George Podiebrad of Bohemia in his legal struggle against Pope Pius II. In 1461 he published a treatise calling for the establishment of a federal union of all Christian states in Europe for the purpose of deciding on political matters out of considerations for the common interests of Europe, while establishing counterweight to Papal authority.

For further reading 
 A. H. Wratislaw (ed.), Diary of an Embassy from King George of Bohemia to King Louis XI of France in the Year of Grace 1464 (London, 1871)

15th-century French Catholic theologians
People from Grenoble